Ahmed Al-Nakhli (born 22 March 2002), is a Saudi Arabian professional footballer who plays as a left back for Saudi Professional League side Al-Ahli.

Career statistics

Club

Notes

References

External links
 

2002 births
Living people
Saudi Arabian footballers
Association football fullbacks
Saudi Professional League players
Saudi First Division League players
Al-Ahli Saudi FC players
Saudi Arabian Shia Muslims